Tonight, by Sea is a young adult novel written by Frances Temple, published in 1995. It is set in Haiti after the overthrow of liberal president Jean-Bertrand Aristide in 1991. It was published by HarperTrophy.

Plot summary
This is a story about a family's dramatic escape from Haiti by sea which also shows the political and economic issues involved.

Paulie lives in Haiti with her Grann and her uncle, the village coffin maker who has turned his skills to boat building to escape the brutality and starvation that has taken over his homeland. Paulie and other neighbors help with the clandestine project, building the boat Seek Life.

Seek life. That's what Paulie's uncle says they must do. But to seek life, safety, and freedom, Paulie and her family have to leave Haiti—the only home that Paulie has ever known. Since forever, Paulie has run in and out of the little houses nestled under the palms, smelling cocoa-bread and playing on the beach with her best friend Karyl. But now the little houses are gone, their wood used to make the boat.

Paulie wants to stay and fight—to change Haiti into a better place to live. She wants to talk to the reporters from Miami and bravely tell the truth, like Karyl's brother, Jean-Desir. But the macoutes come with their guns and knives to stop them. When Jean-Desir is murdered, Paulie must face the truth: before the soldiers come back to take the boat, they must all leave—tonight, by sea.

References 

1995 American novels
Novels set in Haiti
American young adult novels